The Kak Pul (Urdu: کاک پل) (preferred), Kaak Pul or Kaak bridge is a bridge in Islamabad, Pakistan.

Location and geography 
It is built on the Soan River at Islamabad Highway. Soan River is an important stream of the Pothohar region of Pakistan. It drains much of the water of Pothohar.

Famous places near Kak Pul are Sihala town, which is location of National Police Academy of Pakistan, the largest police training college of Pakistan. Other places near Kak Pul are Defence Housing Authority, Islamabad, Institute of Space Technology, Islamabad, Mohammad Ali Jinnah University campus, and Model Town Humak which is a suburb town of Islamabad, Pakistan started back in 1984.

Buildings and structures in Islamabad
Bridges in Pakistan